Timothy David Dalton Philips (born 18 February 1968) is an Irish businessman. He was the CEO of the UK supermarket chain Morrisons from January 2010 until March 2015, when he was succeeded by David Potts. He was the chief executive of DAA, the Irish state-owned global airports and travel retail group which runs Dublin and Cork airports until September 2022 and currently serves as the CEO of Greencore since September of 2022.

Early life
Born in Ireland, Philips is the son of the late Tim Philips, who was managing director of Ballyfree Farms, and the grandson of Osbourne David Philips, an American entrepreneur who invented the plastic zip-lock. Philip's mother Susan was a Independent member of Wicklow County Council and a politics tutor at University College Dublin.

Philips attended Stowe School in Buckinghamshire, has a BA in geography/Greek & Roman civilisation (1990) from University College Dublin, an MBA from Harvard Business School and an honorary doctorate of management from the University of Bradford.

Career
His retailing career began in New Zealand, where he began as a store manager. He then had 11 jobs in 14 countries, including an appointment to Jardine Matheson's Dairy Farm International. He joined Walmart in 1998, and after working in Brazil, rose to the position of Chief Operating Officer in Germany. He then joined the Weston family retail operation as CEO of upmarket Irish department store group Brown Thomas in 2007, and then becoming chief operating officer of Canadian retailer Loblaw in January 2007, under Allan Leighton.

After Morrisons CEO Marc Bolland announced his departure to Marks and Spencers in December 2009, Philips was appointed in a surprise move as his replacement in January 2010. However, Leighton worked with Morrisons chairman Sir Ian Gibson during his tenure at Asda, and is good friends with founder Sir Ken Morrison.

At Morrisons annual AGM in June 2014, Morrisons former chairman Morrison blasted Phillips and his new board of directors for their running of the company Morrison inherited from his father, stating, "I have something like 1000 bullocks and, having listened to your presentation, Dalton, you’ve got a lot more bullshit that me". Morrison's comments were backed up by his nephew Chris Blundell, who controls most of the remaining family stake in the supermarket, also told the board it needed rescuing, and welcomed the decision by chairman Sir Ian Gibson to leave the business next year after months of pressure.

In January 2015, Philips was ousted as chief executive of Wm Morrison after several years of poor performance, a halving of profit and a series of strategic U-turns at what was previously one of Britain’s most successful supermarket chains.

Philips, as well as being the former chairman of Byron, and of the Ridgeon Group, is currently a senior advisor with the Boston Consulting Group, and is a director on three other boards: industrial plastic group One51 Plc., the UK High Street retailer Wilko, and the Social Innovation Fund, a provider of growth capital to Irish social enterprises.

In October 2017, after moving back to his native Ireland from Yorkshire, Philips became chief executive of DAA, a global airports and travel retail group owned by the Irish State and headquartered at Dublin Airport.

Philips was a member of the Irish government's high-level task force on covid-19 vaccination rollout.

In 2020, Philips was awarded UCD Alumnus of the Year in Arts & Humanities.

In May 2022, Philips announced he would be leaving DAA to join Greencore.

Dublin airport delays 
On 1 June 2022, Dalton was called to appear before the Oireachtas transport committee. Dalton's daa, having presided over multiple days of prolonged queues, more than 1,000 passengers missing a flight in one day and providing no guarantee that such queues would not return was described by Minister of State in the Department of Finance, Seán Fleming as a "reflection of bad management, full stop". The Taoiseach said the delays are "unacceptable for passengers and their families."

In May 2021, Phillips had defended the decision to lay off 2,000 of DAA's 7,750 staff, despite the state backstop in place at the time as necessary, stating, "if you had that [bailout] mentality, it’s all over...we have to carry our own water." The decision to fire so many staff was criticised in June 2022 in Dáil Éireann, with deputies claiming that the resultant airport delays had made Ireland in to a "laughing stock".

Personal life 
Philips has other business interests including a number of non-executive directorships, and is known to have a public Christian profile. Philips has three children and is married to Penny Nesbitt, a member of the family who previously owned Arnotts department store, and speaks Spanish, Italian and Portuguese.

References 

1968 births
Living people
People from County Wicklow
People educated at Stowe School
Alumni of University College Dublin
Harvard Business School alumni
Irish businesspeople
Irish expatriates in England
Walmart people
Chief operating officers